Nicola Ciccolo (born September 10, 1940 in Taranto) is a retired Italian professional football player and coach.

References

1940 births
Living people
Sportspeople from Taranto
Italian footballers
Italy under-21 international footballers
Serie A players
Serie B players
A.C.R. Messina players
Hellas Verona F.C. players
Inter Milan players
Mantova 1911 players
S.S. Lazio players
L.R. Vicenza players
A.C. ChievoVerona players
Italian football managers
A.C. ChievoVerona managers

Association football forwards